Sinibrama macrops is a species of ray-finned fish in the genus Sinibrama. It is found in southern and southeastern China (Hong Kong, Guangxi, Guangdong, Hainan, Fujian, Zhejiang) and in Taiwan. It lives in rivers in slow, deep water.

References 

Sinibrama
Freshwater fish of China
Freshwater fish of Taiwan
Fauna of Hong Kong
Fish described in 1868
Taxa named by Albert Günther